David Burrows (born 1977) is an Irish sailor. He competed at the 1996, 2000, 2004 and 2012 Summer Olympics.  His best Olympic result is a 9th place in the Finn class in Sydney in 2000.

References

External links

1977 births
Living people
Irish male sailors (sport)
Olympic sailors of Ireland
Sailors at the 1996 Summer Olympics – Star
Sailors at the 2000 Summer Olympics – Finn
Sailors at the 2004 Summer Olympics – Finn
Sailors at the 2012 Summer Olympics – Star